Vasilios Chatziemmanouil (born 9 August 1999) is a Greek professional footballer who plays as a goalkeeper for Super League club AEK Athens.

Career

AEK Athens
Chatziemmanouil made his debut for the senior team in a 0–2 away victory over Atromitos in January 2022 , where he kept a clean sheet.

On 2 August 2022, he signed a new contract, running until the summer of 2026.

References

1999 births
Living people
Greek footballers
Greece youth international footballers
Super League Greece players
Gamma Ethniki players
AEK Athens F.C. players
Fostiras F.C. players
Association football goalkeepers
People from East Attica
Footballers from Attica
AEK Athens F.C. B players
21st-century Greek people